Latvian Railway History Museum is a railway museum with expositions in Riga and in Jelgava, dedicated to the history of railway and its development in Latvia . The museum is a structural unit of the company "Latvijas dzelzceļš". The museum has the largest collection of wide-gauge vehicles in the Baltics.

Museum in Riga 

The museum's Riga exposition is located in 19th century locomotive repair shops located in Pārdaugava, near the main building of the National Library of Latvia known as Castle of Light. It was established on August 30, 1994, and contains more than a thousand railway-related items. 
Samples of uniforms, tickets, train schedules and other things related to the Latvian Railway can be seen in the expositions. Outside the museum premises, railway rolling stock can be seen - locomotives, wagons and other railway equipment operating in Latvia.

Jelgava Museum exposition 
The Jelgava branch of the museum was opened on 24 December 1982, when the Jelgava Railway Department's Open Achievement Museum was opened in the Jelgava Railway Club. In 1991, the Railway Museum moved to the railwaymen's residential house, which was built in 1903 and is located near Jelgava railway station. The exposition includes semaphores, couplings, trolleys, locomotive wheelsets, hydrant, level crossing equipment and other things related to Latvian Railways.

References 

Museums in Riga
Buildings and structures in Jelgava
Railway museums in Latvia
Museums established in 1994
1994 establishments in Latvia